The Admiral Theatre in Chicago, Illinois opened in 1927 as a vaudeville house. it was designed by Gallup and Joy and acquired by the Balaban and Katz circuit. The Admiral closed sometime in the late 1950s, and remained shuttered for many years until opening in 1969 as an all-cartoon venue. Unable to draw the crowds necessary to remain open, the Admiral closed again. In the early 1970s, the Admiral was opened as an adult movie house. After receiving a facelift in the 1980s, the Admiral continues to thrive as an adult venue and strip club. While the interior has been drastically altered, the facade is in remarkably good shape.

See also
 List of strip clubs

References

Admiral Theatre
Cinema Treasures - Admiral Theatre 
Bill Brashler, Sometimes, even in real life, the tough guys finish dead last, Chicago Sun-Times, January 12, 1987.

Strip clubs in the United States
Tourist attractions in Chicago
1927 establishments in Illinois
Buildings and structures completed in 1927